USCGC Atalanta (WPC-102) was a , steel-hulled, diesel-powered  of the United States Coast Guard.

History
She was launched on 16 June 1934 at the Seattle shipyard of Lake Union Dry Dock & Machine Works, one of 18 Thetis-class patrol boats. She was commissioned on 20 September 1934 and assigned to Seattle, Washington where she conducted rescue and law enforcement operations as well as annual Bering Sea patrols. 
In September 1942, Atalanta was assigned to the United States Navy Western Sea Frontier where she conducted convoy escort and patrol duty. She was one of the early ships in the "Alaskan Navy".

Atalanta was decommissioned on 1 August 1950 and was placed in mothball at the Coast Guard mooring in Kennydale, Renton, Washington. On 7 December 1954, she was sold to Birchfield Boiler, Inc., of Tacoma, Washington for $7,156.

References

External links
 

1934 ships
Thetis-class patrol boats
Ships of the United States Coast Guard
World War II patrol vessels of the United States
Ships built in Seattle
Ships built by the Lake Union Dry Dock Company
Ships of the Aleutian Islands campaign